David John McCosh (1903 Cedar Rapids, Iowa – 1981 Eugene, Oregon) was a Northwest American artist and art instructor. The Jordan Schnitzer Museum of Art has over 170 of his works in their permanent collection.

McCosh graduated from the School of Art Institute of Chicago (AIC) in 1926 and began his teaching career there in 1931. In 1934 McCosh traveled to Santa Fe, New Mexico to marry painter Anne Kutka in the company of his new in-laws, artists and art instructors Suzanne Kutka Boss and Homer Boss. Later that same year the couple relocated to Oregon. There he taught courses in lithography, drawing, oil painting and watercolors at the University of Oregon from 1934 through to his retirement in 1970.

Following his death in 1981, his widow Anne Kutka McCosh donated over a thousand of his works and other art-related materials to the University of Oregon. Included were personal letters, sketch books, and audio interviews with other artists. There was also a 1977 interview of the couple themselves. Some of this material was turned into an essay, The Making of David McCosh. Other essays about McCosh include The Night Drawings of David McCosh, Learning to Paint is Learning to See and David McCosh / Entanglements.

References 

1903 births
1981 deaths
Date of birth missing
Date of death missing
American art educators
Artists from Cedar Rapids, Iowa
Artists from Eugene, Oregon
School of the Art Institute of Chicago alumni
School of the Art Institute of Chicago faculty
20th-century American painters
University of Oregon faculty